Trevelmond is a hamlet in east Cornwall, England, United Kingdom. It is half a mile from St Pinnock.

References

Hamlets in Cornwall